Joni Lovenduski,  (born 1945) is Professor Emerita of Politics at Birkbeck, University of London.

She was previously Anniversary Professor of Politics at Birkbeck (2000-2016), Professor of Politics at the University of Southampton (1995-2000) and Professor of Comparative Politics at Loughborough University (1993-5). She was made a Fellow of the British Academy in 2007. In the same year she received the Special Recognition Award from the Political Studies Association of the United Kingdom. She was presented with the Gender and Politics Award by the European Consortium for Political Research Standing Group on Gender and Politics in 2009.

Career 
Lovenduski has held academic appointments at institutions across Europe and the US. She has been Chair of the Editorial Board of Political Quarterly since 2009. She is a member of the editorial boards of British Politics, The British Journal of Political Science, and French Politics. In 2010 Lovenduski founded the Centre for the Study of British Politics and Public Life at Birkbeck. She was the Centre director until 2016.

Honours
In 2007, Lovenduski was elected a Fellow of the British Academy (FBA), the UK's national academy for the humanities and the social sciences. She was awarded the Sir Isaiah Berlin Prize for Lifetime Contribution to Political Studies by the Political Studies Association in 2013. In 2017 Lovenduski was the recipient of the ECPR Lifetime Achievement Award. The jury recognised "the crucial role [she] has played in defining and developing the field of gender and politics within political science."

Lovenduski's work has been widely influential in feminist political science. A collection of essays reviewing key themes in Lovenduski's work, Deeds and Words: Gendering Politics After Joni Lovenduski, was published in 2014.

In 2017, The Political Studies Association named its prize for outstanding professional achievement by a mid career scholar in her honour to recognise Professor Lovenduski's significant contributions to the PSA and the wider discipline, in particular to the study of gender and politics; and in recognition of her commitment to generous mentoring and championing of junior scholars in the profession.

Selected works 
Lovenduski has written extensively on gender and politics, British politics, and comparative politics.

Books
 
 
 z

Journal articles

Essays in edited collections

References

External links 
 Joni Lovenduski – Birkbeck College
 The Centre for the Study of British Politics and Public Life

Academics of Birkbeck, University of London
Living people
Fellows of the British Academy
1945 births
British women non-fiction writers